Carlos Jorge may refer to:

 Carlos Jorge (footballer) (born 1966), Portuguese footballer
 Carlos Jorge (track athlete) (born 1986), Dominican Republic sprinter, hurdler and long jumper
 Carlos Jorge Fernandes Batalha, better known as Carlos Bebé, (born 1992), Cape Verdean football player
 Carlos Jorge Fortes Magalhães Medina Vasconcelos, commonly known as Tunha, (born 1984), Portuguese futsal player

See also

Portuguese masculine given names